Augustine Abeyta (–1971) was a Puebloan-American painter from Tesuque Pueblo, New Mexico. In October 1937, his work was exhibited at the American Indian Exposition and Congress in Tulsa, Oklahoma. Abeyta was the son of Julio Abeyta, a silversmith and one-time governor of Tesuque Pueblo, and the brother of Crucita Abeyta, a potter known for her jars and bowls.

References 

20th-century American painters
20th-century indigenous painters of the Americas
Native American painters
Pueblo artists
Painters from New Mexico
1914 births
1971 deaths